Erbil International Airport , is the main airport of the city of Erbil in the Kurdistan Region, Iraq. It is administered by the Iraqi Government and the Kurdistan Regional Government under a committee consisting of the Prime Minister of Kurdistan Region, Masrour Barzani, and is one of two international airports (the other being Sulaymaniyah Airport), with a third in Duhok being under construction. The new modern airport opened in 2005. The airport has one of the longest runways in the world.

History
The airport was built at the beginning of the 1970s as an Iraqi military base. The airstrip was used as a military base until 1991 by the Ba'ath Party regime as a result of United Nations Security Council establishing a no-fly zone over northern Iraq. After the 2003 US invasion, the Kurdistan Regional Government took over administrative rule of the region. On 26 May 2005, the airport was given the ICAO airport code, ORER. Endowed with natural resources including oil, natural gas and other minerals, investment in Iraq has increased substantially since 2005. The city of Erbil has been a large recipient of foreign investments. Due to the growing need for safe access into the country, the Regional Government invested US$500 million in the construction of a modern airport.

Old airport
The old Erbil airport covered , and was divided into departure and arrival halls. The Kurdistan International Bank, a Tourism Information office, the airline companies offices, duty-free shops, a cafeteria, and the Korek Telecom office were located inside the terminal.

The cargo was handled by Dnata, a Dubai-based company.

New airport
A newly built, US$550 million airport was opened on 5 July 2005. The new airport is next to the old airport (previously a military field) and has one of the world's longest runways,  and is equipped for ILS CAT II operations. The airport's new terminal has duty-free shops and currency exchange offices. The terminal also has VIP areas for business jets, and there is a VIP terminal for visiting dignitaries and diplomats for the purpose of achieving international airport standards.

In 2010 Erbil International Airport had the least expensive aviation fuel in Iraq (at 83 US cents per litre).

From 29 September 2017, until 14 March 2018, following the 2017 Kurdistan Region independence referendum, all commercial international flights were suspended. The airport remained open for domestic, humanitarian, military, and diplomatic flights.

Drone attacks 
The airport has been the target of numerous drone strikes by Iran-backed Shi'ite militias in 2021. On 15 April, a drone carrying explosives targeted the military section of the airport. The section housed US-led forces, and no casualties were reported. On 6 July, another drone targeted the same section of the airport and crashed near the airport. On 11 September, two drones carrying explosives failed to reach the airport; one was shot down by C-RAM air defense and the other one crashed. There were no casualties.

Airlines and destinations

Passenger

These are the airlines and destinations served from Erbil Airport:

Cargo

Statistics

Since its opening in 2006, the airport has seen increased traffic. Traffic was up 22% in 2010 and in 2011 demand was up 37% to just over 620,000 passengers. In the first four months of 2012 passenger numbers are up 52% with April setting a new record of 84,275 departing and arriving passengers.

Incidents
On July 6, 2021, a series of attacks against the airport were reported, including drone and rocket attacks.

References

External links
Official website

Airports in Iraq
Airport
Ankawa
Airports in Kurdistan Region (Iraq)
2005 establishments in Iraq
Airports established in 2005
2005 establishments in Iraqi Kurdistan